Annette Hersey Johnson (later Annette Acton-Adams; 27 June 1928 – 29 September 2017) was an alpine skier from New Zealand. She competed for New Zealand at the 1952 Winter Olympics at Oslo, and came 30th in the Giant Slalom (3-0.66), the best result for the New Zealand team, but did not finish in the Slalom. Her niece Fiona Johnson was an alpine skier at the 1980 Winter Olympics.

References

External links 
 
 
 Annette Johnson's obituary

1928 births
2017 deaths
New Zealand female alpine skiers
Olympic alpine skiers of New Zealand
Alpine skiers at the 1952 Winter Olympics